Andrzej Sobieszczyk (born 5 May 1993) is a Polish professional footballer who plays as a goalkeeper for Avia Świdnik. He formerly played for Puszcza Niepołomice, Motor Lublin, and Hetman Zamość.

Club career
Sobieszczyk began his career at Skawa Wadowice. He played at youth level at Skawa, before making his senior debut for the club in 2011. On 14 April 2012, he scored a goal in the 43rd minute against Iskra Brzezinka at a distance of 70 meters.

In 2012, Sobieszczyk signed a contract with II liga club Puszcza Niepołomice, but he spent the 2012–13 season on loan at Wiślanka Grabie and Czarni Staniątki. During his loan spell, Puszcza gained promotion to the I liga. He made his professional debut on 2 August 2013, in Puszcza's first home match of the season, a 2–1 defeat to Chojniczanka Chojnice. On 21 September 2016, Puszcza reached quarter-final of the Polish Cup for the first time in club's history, beating Ekstraklasa side Lechia Gdańsk 4–2 in a penalty shootout. Sobieszczyk saved two penalty shots in the shootout, from Miloš Krasić, and Lukáš Haraslín.

On 9 February 2018, Sobieszyk signed a contract with Motor Lublin. On 18 June 2019, he joined newly promoted III liga side Hetman Zamość.

International career
Sobieszczyk made his first and only appearance for the Poland national under-20 football team on 19 November 2013 in a friendly home match to Germany at Stadion Górnika Łęczna, in front of 7,500 fans.

References

External links
 

1993 births
Polish footballers
Motor Lublin players
Avia Świdnik players
I liga players
II liga players
III liga players
Living people
Association football goalkeepers
Footballers from Kraków
Poland youth international footballers